Nigma is a genus of  cribellate araneomorph spiders in the family Dictynidae, and was first described by Pekka T. Lehtinen in 1967. They have a wide distribution, including Eurasia, North America, and Northern Africa. They are translucent green and sometimes have red or black markings on the abdomen.

Species
 it contains fourteen species:
Nigma conducens (O. Pickard-Cambridge, 1876) – North Africa
Nigma flavescens (Walckenaer, 1830) (type) – Europe, Caucasus, Iran
Nigma gertschi (Berland & Millot, 1940) – Senegal
Nigma gratiosa (Simon, 1881) – Portugal, Spain, North Africa
Nigma hortensis (Simon, 1870) – Portugal, Spain, France, Algeria
Nigma laeta (Spassky, 1952) – Azerbaijan, Iran, Tajikistan
Nigma linsdalei (Chamberlin & Gertsch, 1958) – USA
Nigma longipes (Berland, 1914) – East Africa
Nigma nangquianensis (Hu, 2001) – China
Nigma puella (Simon, 1870) – Europe, Azores, Madeira, Canary Is.
Nigma shiprai (Tikader, 1966) – India
Nigma tuberosa Wunderlich, 1987 – Canary Is.
Nigma vulnerata (Simon, 1914) – Mediterranean
Nigma walckenaeri (Roewer, 1951) – Europe, Turkey, Caucasus

References

External links
Nigma at BugGuide

Araneomorphae genera
Cosmopolitan spiders
Dictynidae
Taxa named by Pekka T. Lehtinen